{{DISPLAYTITLE:C7H17N}}
The molecular formula C7H17N (molar mass: 115.22 g/mol, exact mass: 115.1361 u) may refer to:

 Methylhexanamine (also known as methylhexamine, 1,3-dimethylamylamine, 1,3-DMAA, dimethylamylamine, and DMAA)
 Tuaminoheptane

Molecular formulas